Ellis in Wonderland is the debut album by jazz guitarist Herb Ellis, accompanied by the Oscar Peterson trio, trumpeter Harry "Sweets" Edison, and saxophonists Charlie Mariano and Jimmy Giuffre.

Track listing

Personnel
 Herb Ellis – guitar
 Harry "Sweets" Edison – trumpet
 Charlie Mariano – alto saxophone
 Jimmy Giuffre – baritone saxophone, tenor saxophone, clarinet
 Oscar Peterson – piano
 Ray Brown – double bass
 Alvin Stoller – drums

References 

1956 debut albums
Herb Ellis albums
Norgran Records albums